Robert Shawe (circa 1699 to 1752) was an Irish academic who spent his final years as a clergyman. He was Donegall Lecturer of maths at Trinity College Dublin (TCD) from 1734 to 1735.

Life and career
Shawe was born in near Athenry, in county Galway, Ireland.  He attended TCD, being elected a scholar in 1717. He graduated BA in 1719, obtained MA in 1722, and was elected a Fellow the same year (replacing Richard Helsham). He was Professor of Oratory and History (1732-1738). In 1734, he was awarded DD and  became Donegall Lecturer of mathematics for a year, also serving as vice-provost (1734-1744).  He was appointed Regius Professor of Laws (1740-1743). In 1743 he became the rector of Ardstraw, in County Tyrone.

References

Alumni of Trinity College Dublin
People from County Galway
Donegall Lecturers of Mathematics at Trinity College Dublin
Fellows of Trinity College Dublin
1699 births
1752 deaths